The West Seneca Central School District is the third largest central school district in Western New York, and one of the largest school districts in New York State. It serves , including a majority of the town of West Seneca, and portions of the towns of Cheektowaga, Orchard Park, and Hamburg. It was centralized in 1946.

District
West Seneca's District Offices are located at 675 Potters Rd, West Seneca NY 14224.

Current Administration 
Matthew Bystrak - Superintendent
Jonathan Cervoni - Assistant Superintendent of Administrative Operations
Carmelina Persico – Assistant Superintendent for Educational Operations
Kristin Collins–Director of Special Education
Marisa Fallacaro-Dougherty athletic director 
Beth Johnson–Personnel Supervisor
Brian Schulz–District Treasurer
Janice Lewandowski–Financial and Computer Services Manager
Michael Rybak–School Resource Officer

Board of Education 2018-2019 
 Carol A. Jarczyk, President
 Diane Beres, Vice President
 Janice E. Dalbo, Trustee
 Edmund Bedient, Trustee
 Peter Kwitkowski, Trustee
 Lawrence Seibert, Trustee
 Mary J. Busse, Trustee
 Janice E. Dalbo, Trustee

District History

Selected Former Superintendents 
Previous assignment and reason for departure denoted in parentheses
Pierce McGrath
Vincent J. Coppola–?-1994 (unknown, named Superintendent of the Corning-Painted Post Central School District)
Merton L. Haynes [interim]–1994 (Interim Superintendent - Grand Island Central School District, named Interim Superintendent of Alden Central School District)
Richard L. Sagar–1994-2001 (Superintendent - Beacon City School District, fired)
John F. Schleifer Jr. [interim]–2001-2002 (Deputy Superintendent - West Seneca Central School District, retired)
James K. Brotz–2002-2007 (Principal - West Seneca West High School, retired)
Jean M. Kovach–2007-2010 (Assistant Superintendent of Curriculum & Instruction - West Seneca School District, retired)
Mark J. Crawford–2010-2017 (Superintendent - Hamburg Central School District, retired)
Whitney K. Vantine [interim]– 2017 (Superintendent - Tonawanda City School District, terminated)

2013-present
In 2013, the district underwent major changes. State funding to the district was cut much like all over New York State. District-wide enrollment dropped, and over 10% of the staff in the district left the payroll. The Alternative Learning Center was closed and students were sent back to either East or West High Schools. The start times and bell schedules of the middle and high schools were changed and moved to an earlier time to minimize transportation costs. Middle School grades were changed from previously 7–8 grade to 6–8 on the West side and 5–8 on the East side. East Elementary school which formerly shared a building with East Middle school was closed to accommodate the new grades in the middle school. The former K-4th graders at East El. were sent to nearby Clinton Street Elementary School or Northwood Elementary School and the former 5th and 6th graders at East El. moved to East Middle school.

In 2015, Potters Road Elementary School closed due to a vote by the school board, but was reopened for the 2021–2022 school year under the name Winchester Potters Elementary School.

In 2021, Winchester Elementary School had to close down also due to a vote by the school board. Also, fifth graders were moved back to Clinton Street and Northwood Elementary Schools

Schools
At the high schools, over 10% of the students are enrolled in Advanced Placement Courses. The high schools offer National Academy Foundation diplomas in the courses of the Academy of Finance and the Academy of Information Technology. Over 80% of the graduates seek higher education opportunities. Looping through grade levels have been implemented in the elementary grades as well as middle school. A district-wide gifted and talented program exists at the intermediate and middle school levels.

High schools

West Seneca East High School 

East Senior High School is located at 4760 Seneca Street and serves grades 9–12. The principal is Jason Winnicki.

Selected former principals 
Previous assignment and reason for departure denoted in parentheses
Wesley Starkweather–1969-1975
aniel P. Mazuchowski–1975-1991 (Vice Principal - West Seneca East High School, retired)
Renee F. Goshin–1991-2004 (Assistant Principal - West Seneca East High School, retired)
Angela J. Lapaglia–2004-2011 (Assistant Principal - West Seneca East High School, retired)

West Seneca West High School 

West Senior High School is located at 3330 Seneca Street and serves grades 9–12. The principal is Jay Brinker.

Selected former principals 

Previous assignment and reason for departure denoted in parentheses
Thomas F. Daley
John Schleifer–?-1991 (unknown, named Director of Secondary Education for West Seneca Central School District)
James Brotz–1991-2002 (Assistant Principal - West Seneca West High School, named Superintendent of West Seneca Central School District)
Kevin J. Eberle–2002-2004 (Assistant Principal - Lake Shore Central High School, named Principal of Grover Cleveland High School)
Jon T. MacSwan–2004-2011 (Assistant Principal - Williamsville East High School, named Superintendent of Cleveland Hill Union Free School District)

Academic Schedule

Middle schools

East Middle School 

East Middle School serves grades 6-8 and is located at 1445 Center Road. The principal is Jason Marchioli.

Selected former principals 

Previous assignment and reason for departure denoted in parentheses
John H. Robson–1964-1967 (Administrative Intern - Kenmore-Town of Tonawanda Union Free School District, named Acting Assistant Superintendent of West Seneca Central School District)
Monica L. Whitman–1998-2009 (Principal - Hamburg Middle School, resigned)
James Klubek–2009-2010 (Assistant Principal - West Seneca East High School, named Principal of Silver Creek High School)
Vincent Dell'Oso–2010-2013 (Principal - Lewiston-Porter Middle School, named Director of Athletics of West Seneca Central School District)

West Middle School 

West Middle School is located at 395 Center Road, and serves grades 6–8. The principal is David Kean.

Selected former principals 
Previous assignment and reason for departure denoted in parentheses
Louis R. Donato–1972-1985 (Vice Principal - West Seneca West Junior High School, retired)
Richard Spagenberg; 1986-1990 (unknown, retired)
Richard D. Caputi–1990-1995 (Assistant Principal - West Seneca West Senior High School, retired)
Ronald A. Wisher–1995-2006 (unknown, retired)
Brian Graham–2006-2013 (Principal - Winchester Elementary School, named Assistant Superintendent of Pupil Services of West Seneca Central School District)

Elementary schools
Allendale Elementary School (Grades K-5) (Built in 1964)
Clinton Elementary School (Grades K-5) (Built in 1967)
Northwood Elementary School (Grades K-5) (Built in 1970)
Ebenezer Elementary School (Grades K-5) (Built in 1969)
Reserve Elementary School (Grades K-5) (Built in 1964)
Winchester Potters Elementary School (Grades K-5) (Built in 1955)

Closed schools
Allendale Middle School (Grades 7–8, closed June 1999)
East Elementary School (Grades K–6, closed June 2013)
Winchester Elementary School (Grades K–5, closed June 2021)
Alternative Learning Center (Grades 9–12, closed June 2013)

Bird's Eye Images

Elementary schools 
Allendale Elementary School
Clinton Street Elementary School
Northwood Elementary School
West Elementary School
Winchester Potters Elementary School

Middle schools 
East Middle School
West Middle School

High schools 
West Seneca East Senior High School
West Seneca West Senior High School

References

http://www.wscschools.org

School districts in New York (state)
Education in Erie County, New York
School districts established in 1946